The Kings Highway station is a local station on the BMT Sea Beach Line of the New York City Subway, located at the intersection of Kings Highway and West Seventh Street in Gravesend, Brooklyn. It is served by the N train at all times. During rush hours, several W and northbound Q trains also serve the station.

History
This station opened on June 22, 1915, along with the rest of the Sea Beach Line.

From January 18, 2016, to May 22, 2017, the Manhattan-bound platform at this station was closed for renovations. The Coney Island-bound platform was closed for a much longer period of time, from July 31, 2017 to October 29, 2018. In 2019, the Metropolitan Transportation Authority announced that this station would become ADA-accessible as part of the agency's 2020–2024 Capital Program.

Station layout

This open-cut station has four tracks and two side platforms. The two center express tracks are not normally used, but both tracks are available for rerouted trains. The platforms are carved within the Earth's crust on an open cut. The concrete walls and columns are painted beige (previously the columns were blue-green).

This station has two entrances, both of which are beige station houses at street-level between West Seventh and West Eighth Streets above the tracks. Each one has a single staircase leading to each platform at either extreme ends. The main exit at the north end has a turnstile bank and token booth and leads to Kings Highway while the exit at the south end leads to Highlawn Avenue and is un-staffed, containing just HEET turnstiles and exit-only turnstiles.

At the southeast end of the station, switches allow trains to crossover between any of the four tracks. North of here, the Manhattan-bound express track continues with the rest of Sea Beach Line, but there are no signals until Eighth Avenue, so only one train is allowed to run along this stretch at a time. It is signaled for bi-directional service like other center tracks on three track lines throughout the system. The Coney Island-bound express track has been severed from the other three tracks between Eighth Avenue and this station and is unusable for service. South of this station, the two usable express tracks continue until they merge with the local tracks south of 86th Street station.

Notes

References

External links 

 Station Reporter — N Train
 The Subway Nut — Kings Highway Pictures
 Kings Highway entrance from Google Maps Street View
 Highlawn Avenue entrance from Google Maps Street View
 Uptown Platform from Google Maps Street View

BMT Sea Beach Line stations
New York City Subway stations in Brooklyn
Railway stations in the United States opened in 1915
1915 establishments in New York City